Moseley Wanderers represented Great Britain at the 1900 Summer Olympics at rugby union. They played one game, losing 27–8 to France, winning the Silver medal.

Rugby Union at the 1900 Olympics

Great Britain, France and Germany were the sole participants of the inaugural rugby event at the Olympics. The first game, held on 14 October, was between France and Germany. Despite losing 5–14 at half time France beat Germany 27–17.

The second game saw Moseley Wanderers take on France on the 28 October. France beat the British team 27–8 in front of six thousand people which was the largest crowd of the games. The British squad was shut out in the first half, while France continued the scoring barrage they had experienced in the second half of the Germany match.  Serrade scored two tries, bringing his tournament total to five.  Joseph Olivier, Jean Collas, and Jean-Guy Gauthier each added a try.  No conversions were scored, though André Rischmann's two penalties brought France's first-half total to 21.

Britain actually outscored France in the second half, 8–6, but had little chance of catching up.  Joseph Wallis scored a try while J. Henry Birtles made a conversion and a penalty for Britain.  Reichel scored his second try of the tournament, and Léon Binoche added a try to bring France's victory to a 27–8 margin.

The team
It is unclear how the team was chosen. Four of the players, including the captain J. Henry Birtles, played for Moseley, with a number of others also playing for Midlands-based clubs such as Aston Old Edwardians or Coventry.

Why were Moseley at the Olympics?
How the team came to be chosen to represent Britain at the Olympics is not known. On the 28 October the Birmingham Evening Gazette reported:

England v France
Sunday football is neither popular nor frequent here but it is one of the latest diversions that help to make the French Sabbath so much unlike ours. 
On Sunday an English fifteen will meet the French Rugby Union at the Paris Exhibition Grounds. The following players representing the English Union left London late last night for the purpose.

And on the 29 October The Times reported:

Football in Paris, October 28
A rugby football match was played today at the Velodrome Municipal at Vincennes between Moseley Wanderers and a team representing the full strength of France. A crowd of 10,000 persons was present. The French team held the advantage from the first and ultimately gained victory by 27 points to 8. The defeat of the Moseley team which was a strong one may be attributed partly to the fatigue of the journey. They only arrived in Paris this morning and have to leave again this evening. – Reuters.

Neither of the reports mention the Olympics with the Evening Gazette reporting on the English Union rather than British team and it is unclear whether the players even realized they were competing in the Olympics. However it is clear that fatigue was probably a major contributor to the defeat. At least five of the players are believed to have played for their respective clubs, in England, the day before the game. For example, it is recorded that Clement Deykin represented the Midland Counties on the 24 October, Moseley on 27 October, made the trip to Paris overnight, and then played for the Wanderers the next day.

Players
 F. C. Bayliss Moseley
 J. Henry Birtles (Captain) Moseley
 James Cantion London Irish
 Arthur Darby Cambridge University
 Clement Deykin Moseley
 L. Hood Rosslyn Park
 M. L. Logan London Scottish
 Herbert Loveitt Coventry
 Herbert Nicol Old Edwardians
 V. Smith Old Edwardians
 M. W. Talbot Moseley
 Joseph Wallis Old Edwardians
 Claude Whittindale Aston Old Edwardians
 Raymond Whittindale
 Francis Wilson Old Crusaders

References

English rugby union teams
Olympic rugby union players of Great Britain
Moseley